Mojanci is a village in the municipality of Aračinovo, North Macedonia.

Demographics
According to the 2021 census, the village had a total of 2.912 inhabitants. Ethnic groups in the village include:
Albanians 2.865
Macedonians 1
Others 46

References

External links 

Villages in Aračinovo Municipality
Albanian communities in North Macedonia